Clarkson Corners Historic District is a national historic district located at the hamlet of Clarkson Corners in Monroe County, New York. The district encompasses approximately 60 historic resources associated with the Clarkson crossroads development between about 1804 and 1910.

It was listed on the National Register of Historic Places in 1994.

References

External links

Historic districts on the National Register of Historic Places in New York (state)
Georgian architecture in New York (state)
Historic districts in Monroe County, New York
National Register of Historic Places in Monroe County, New York